European Democracy (DE) was a minor Christian-democratic, centrist political party in Italy.

History
European Democracy was founded in 2001 by Sergio D'Antoni (former leader of the Italian Confederation of Workers' Trade Unions), Giulio Andreotti and Ortensio Zecchino, all three splitters from the Italian People's Party. Many ex-members of Lega Nord, including Vito Gnutti (former Minister of Industry) and Domenico Comino (and floor leader in the Chamber of Deputies).

In the 2001 general election the party scored 2.3% on a stand-alone list, winning only two seats in the Senate. In December 2002 it was merged with the Christian Democratic Centre and the United Christian Democrats to form the Union of Christian and Centre Democrats (UDC). Sergio D'Antoni became vice-secretary of the new party.

Electoral results

Italian Parliament

References

Political parties disestablished in 2001
Christian democratic parties in Italy
Centrist parties in Italy
Political parties established in 2000
Defunct Christian political parties
2000 establishments in Italy
Defunct political parties in Italy
2001 disestablishments in Italy
Giulio Andreotti
Catholic political parties